No Promises is a compilation album by Australian rock band, Icehouse.

Track listing
 "Taking The Town"
 "No Promises"
 "This Time"
 "Dusty Pages"
 "On My Mind"
 "The Mountain"
 "Paradise"
 "Angel Street"
 "Spanish Gold"
 "Lucky Me"
 "Fatman"
 "Nothing To Do"

References

1997 compilation albums
Icehouse (band) albums